The Kutaisi uezd was a county (uezd) of the Kutaisi Governorate of the Caucasus Viceroyalty of the Russian Empire. It bordered the Akhaltsikhe uezd of the Tiflis Governorate to the south, the Ozurgeti and Senaki uezds to the west, the Lechkhumi and Racha uezds to the north, and the Shorapani uezd to the east. The area of the uezd corresponded to most of the contemporary Imereti region of Georgia. The Kutaisi uezd was eponymously named for its administrative center, Kutais (present-day Kutaisi).

History 
The Kutaisi uezd was formed in 1846 as part of the Kutaisi Governorate on the territory of the historical region of Imereti during the time of the Russian Empire. In 1918, the Kutaisi Governorate including the Kutaisi uezd was incorporated into the Democratic Republic of Georgia.

Administrative divisions 
The subcounties (uchastoks) of the Kutaisi uezd in 1913 were:

Demographics

Russian Empire Census 
The majority of the population indicated Imeretian to be their mother tongue, with significant Georgian and Russian speaking minorities:

Kavkazskiy kalendar 

Notes

References

Bibliography 

Uezds of Kutaisi Governorate